Peleteria rubescens is a Palearctic species of fly in the family Tachinidae.

Distribution
It is found throughout Europe from Portugal to Russia.

References

Tachininae
Diptera of Europe
Insects described in 1830